Tatiana Golovin and Richard Gasquet were the defending champions, but they chose not to participate together. The tournament was won by Daniela Hantuchová and Fabrice Santoro.

Seeds
The seeded teams are listed below. Daniela Hantuchová and Fabrice Santoro are the champions; other teams show the round in which they were eliminated.

Draws

Finals

Top half

Section 1

Section 2

Bottom half

Section 3

Section 4

References

External links
WTA Draw
2005 French Open – Doubles draws and results at the International Tennis Federation

Mixed doubles
French Open by year – Mixed doubles